John Flanagan (26 April 1942 – 30 September 2013) was a Scottish footballer, who played as a forward.

Flanagan played for Albion Rovers, St Johnstone, Partick Thistle and Clyde.

References

1942 births
2013 deaths
Place of death missing
Footballers from Glasgow
Association football forwards
Scottish footballers
Glasgow Perthshire F.C. players
Albion Rovers F.C. players
St Johnstone F.C. players
Partick Thistle F.C. players
Clyde F.C. players
St Roch's F.C. players
Scottish Football League players